Ransart is a commune in the Pas-de-Calais department in the Hauts-de-France region of France.

Geography

Population

Places of interest
 The church of St.Laurent was rebuilt, as was much of the village, after World War I.

See also
Communes of the Pas-de-Calais department

References

External links

 Ransart on the Quid website 

Communes of Pas-de-Calais